Jean-Pierre Giudicelli (born 20 February 1943) is a French former modern pentathlete. He competed at the 1968 Summer Olympics and the 1972 Summer Olympics. In 1968, he won a bronze medal in the team event.

References

1943 births
Living people
French male modern pentathletes
Olympic modern pentathletes of France
Modern pentathletes at the 1968 Summer Olympics
Modern pentathletes at the 1972 Summer Olympics
Olympic bronze medalists for France
Olympic medalists in modern pentathlon
Medalists at the 1968 Summer Olympics